Tom Oliver Richards (born 16 October 1994) is an English semi-professional footballer who plays as a left midfielder for Horsham.

Richards spent his youth career at Fulham and made his senior debut on loan at AFC Wimbledon in 2014. He also spent time on loan at Aldershot Town before a permanent move in 2015. Richards spent five months in Austria with fourth division side FC Kitzbühel before joining Walton Casuals in 2017. He joined Welling United in February 2017.

Club career

Fulham
Richards joined Fulham after a successful six-week trial in 2011, having been spotted playing Sunday league football. Adapting from a midfield role to full-back in his first season with the club, he lifted the Under-18s national title in 2012 before retaining the title alongside the Dallas Cup in 2013.

On 10 July 2013, Richards signed a one-year deal with an option to extend for a further season. He joined the Under-21 squad ahead of the 2013–14 season, and after sixteen appearances for the youth side was rewarded with a loan spell in the Football League.

On 28 February 2014, Richards joined AFC Wimbledon on loan for the remainder of the season. He made his professional debut in a 0–0 draw at Fleetwood Town on 1 March. Richards made ten appearances for the League Two club before his return to Craven Cottage in May.

On 21 February 2015, he joined Conference Premier club Aldershot Town on loan for the remainder of the season. Richards made his debut in a 3–1 victory over Dover Athletic on 3 March. He made nine appearances for the club during his loan spell.

Aldershot Town
On 6 June 2015, Richards joined Aldershot Town on a permanent basis following his impressive loan spell. Signing a one-year deal at the club, he scored his first goal for the club in a 1–0 victory against Guiseley.

With 27 appearances to his name during the 2015–16 campaign, Richards was released after the expiry of his contract and the arrival of new manager Gary Waddock.

FC Kitzbühel
In July 2016, Richards joined FC Kitzbühel, an Austrian fourth-tier club. He scored two goals in 17 appearances prior to the winter break. In December 2016, he agreed to a contract termination allowing him to return to England.

Later career
On 26 January 2017, Richards joined Isthmian Division One South side Walton Casuals. On 28 January, he made his debut in a 3–2 victory against Sittingbourne. He went on to make four appearances for the club before his departure. Richards played his final game in a 3–7 defeat to East Grinstead Town on 11 February.

On 17 February, Richards signed for National League South club Welling United. He made his debut the following day in a 2–2 draw at Weston Super Mare. On 30 July 2017, Richards joined Isthmian League Premier Division side Leatherhead after not being able to agree a deal with Welling. He transferred to Dorking Wanderers in summer 2018 and later Kingstonian fromin July 2020 He signed for Horsham in summer 2021.

Personal life
Richards is a Chelsea supporter, but would often watch Fulham as a child due to his father and youth coach. As a child, Richards was nicknamed 'Duffer' due to a similarity in appearance to Damien Duff.

Career statistics

Notes

References

External links
 
 Walton Casuals FC profile

1994 births
Living people
Sportspeople from Guildford
Fulham F.C. players
AFC Wimbledon players
Aldershot Town F.C. players
Walton Casuals F.C. players
Welling United F.C. players
Leatherhead F.C. players
Dorking Wanderers F.C. players
Kingstonian F.C. players
Horsham F.C. players
English Football League players
Association football midfielders
Footballers from Surrey
English footballers
English expatriate footballers
English expatriate sportspeople in Austria
Expatriate footballers in Austria